Salcatonin is the type of calcitonin hormone found in salmon.

As in humans, salmon calcitonin is a peptide hormone secreted by the parafollicular cells of the thyroid gland in response to hypercalcemia, and lowers blood calcium and phosphate by promoting renal excretion.

Therapeutic usage
Synthetic salmon calcitonin may be used therapeutically in humans, as it is twenty times more active than human calcitonin and has a longer half-life. It is used as therapy for Paget's disease and severe hypercalcemia. It is also used as a therapy against osteoporosis (working as an inhibitor of osteoclastic resorption), having an effectiveness of 40-50 times that of the human analogue.

Pharmaceutical salmon calcitonin formulations
Calcitonin, as salmon calcitonin (sCT), is available in the pharmaceutical market as an injectable preparation for intravenous, intramuscular or subcutaneous application. Noninvasive sCT preparation as a nasal spray is commercially produced and received US FDA approval under the proprietary name Miacalcin® in 1975 for the treatment of postmenopausal osteoporosis. The bioavailability of   Miacalcin® nasal spray relative to the injectable form is between 3% and 5%.
Currently, a number of sCT oral preparations are under clinical trials and at least one of them has reached Phase III of clinical approval.

References

Peptide hormones
Fish hormones
Hormones of calcium metabolism
Hormones of the thyroid gland